This is a list of regions of Mauritania by Human Development Index as of 2023 with data for the year 2021. An HDI value is calculated for the Trarza Region and the city of Nouakchott (comprising the regions of Nouakchott-Nord, Nouakchott-Ouest and Nouakchott-Sud since 2014) combined.

References 

Mauritania
Human Development Index
Regions by Human Development Index
HDI